Baron David René James de Rothschild (born December 15, 1942) is a French banker and a member of the French branch of the Rothschild family. Since 2018, he is supervisory board chairman of Rothschild & Co and chairman of Rothschild Continuation Holdings, a Swiss holding company.

Early life and education
David de Rothschild was born in New York City, as a result of his parents having to escape the Germans during the German occupation of France in World War II. He is the son of Guy de Rothschild (1909–2007) and his first wife and distant cousin, the former Baroness Alix Hermine Jeannette Schey de Koromla (1911–1982). His maternal grandfather was the Hungarian Baron Pips Schey. While his mother remained in New York City throughout the war, his father went to England where he joined the Free French Forces. Following the liberation of France, the family returned to their home in Paris. His parents eventually divorced. David de Rothschild was educated at Institut d'Études Politiques de Paris in Paris from which he graduated in 1966.

He has one half-brother: Baron Édouard de Rothschild from his father's later marriage to Baroness Marie-Hélène van Zuylen van Nyevelt.

Career
David René de Rothschild first worked at Société miniére et métallurgique de Peñarroya, a mining company owned by his family and headquartered in Paris. Afterwards, he did a training in de Rothschild Frères bank.

When the French government reform of banking regulations ended the legal distinction between banques d'affaires and deposit banks, the bank de Rothschild Frères became Banque Rothschild in 1967, a limited-liability company. David de Rothschild's father was an aggressive businessman who strove to expand the bank and their investments in mining and oil exploration as chairman of Imetal S.A. However, the family fortunes suffered a severe setback following the election to the French Presidency of the socialist government of François Mitterrand in 1981. The new parliament nationalized the Banque Rothschild.

In 1986, when the Socialists lost power, the Rothschild family got a new banking license in France. In 1987 — joined by his half-brother Edouard, step-brother Count Philippe de Nicolay, and cousin Eric de Rothschild — David René de Rothschild created Rothschild & Cie Banque, the successor of Banque Rothschild.

In 2003, following the retirement of Sir Evelyn Robert de Rothschild as head of N M Rothschild & Sons of London, the UK and French firms merged to become one umbrella entity called "Group Rothschild". Ownership was shared equally between the French and British branches of the family under the leadership of David de Rothschild.

In 2015, Rothschild was indicted in Spain for fraud in relation to a scheme that allegedly defrauded British retirees who signed up for an inheritance tax minimization scheme.

In 2018, his son Alexandre de Rothschild took his succession as Chairman of Rothschild & Co, while David René de Rothschild became chairman of the supervisory board.

Other roles and mandates 
Rothschild holds or has held the following positions:
Member of the supervisory board of Compagnie Financiere Saint-Honore
Member of the supervisory board of Compagnie Financiere Martin Maurel.
Member of the supervisory board of De Beers Group
Member of the supervisory board of Groupe Casino
2013-...: President of the World Jewish Congress
President of the Fondation pour la Mémoire de la Shoah
President of the French Entente Cordiale Scholarship trust,
Minority shareholder of the vineyard Château Lafite-Rothschild

Personal life
In 1974, David de Rothschild married the Italian Olimpia Anna Aldobrandini (b. 1955) in Reux, Calvados. They have four children:
 Lavinia Anne Alix de Rothschild (b. 1976).
 Stéphanie Anne Marie de Buffévent (b. 1977), married Augustin de Buffévent in 2005.
 Alexandre Guy Francesco de Rothschild (b. 1980), married Olivia Bordeaux-Groult in 2009. Alexandre became executive chairman of the family business in 2018.
 Louise Lili Béatrice de Rothschild (b. 1989)
As of 2022, his net worth was estimated at €575 million by French weekly business magazine Challenges.

References

1942 births
Living people
French bankers
20th-century French Jews
French viticulturists
Businesspeople from Paris
David Rene
Fellows of King's College London
Fellows of the American Academy of Arts and Sciences
N M Rothschild & Sons people